Narkatiaganj Junction  (station code:- NKE), is a railway station in the Samastipur railway division of East Central Railway. It is one of the busiest and important junctions of Samastipur division. The station is located in the town of Narkatiaganj, a sub-division of West Champaran district in the Indian state of Bihar.

Platforms 
The four platforms are accessible only through a level-crossing side on platform no. 1 & 2 where an office for station officials and facilities for ticket and waiting are situated. The platforms are interconnected with foot overbridges (FOB). Platforms 1, 2 3 & 4 are also connected to FOB, platform no 5 is lower-level platform.

Trains 
Samastipur is the divisional headquarters; several local passenger trains and express trains run from Narkatiaganj to neighbouring destinations.
List of some important trains that stop at Narkatiaganj:

*Pending

 Pair of passenger train run from Gorakhpur to Narkatiaganj
 Pair of MEMU passenger train run from Muzaffarpur to Narkatiaganj
 Pair of trains run from Raxaul to Narkatiaganj

Doubling MFP-NKE-PNY undergoing project.

Connectivity 
The nearest airport to Narkatiaganj Junction is Gorakhpur Airport,  distance.
Patna airport is an alternative airport, situated from Narkatiaganj to  distance.

See also 
 Bhikhna Thori railway station

References

External links 
 Narkatiaganj Junction Map
 Official website of the West champaran district

Railway stations in West Champaran district
Railway junction stations in Bihar
Samastipur railway division